Herman Guidry, better known as "Sticks" Herman, (born September 1, 1935) was a Louisiana blues musician of the 1950s. He recorded for Eddie Shuler's Goldband Records, including "Teenage Baby", though "Give Me Your Love" / "Lonely Feeling" on Tic Toc were less well received.

References

Louisiana blues musicians
1935 births
Living people